The Tour de Cure is a series of fund-raising cycling events held in forty states nationwide to benefit the American Diabetes Association. The Tour de Cure is a bicycle ride to raise money for diabetes research, and is not an actual race. Each location's ride routes are designed for everyone from the occasional rider to the experienced cyclist.

Riders 
Over 33,000 riders participated in the 2007 Tour de Cure. In 2008, more than 38,000 cyclists in 78 Tour events raised nearly $16 million to support the mission of the ADA: to prevent and cure diabetes and to improve the lives of all people affected by diabetes.

Red Riders 
In 2007 the ADA began recognizing those riders with diabetes as Red Riders through the Red Rider Program.  This program was created and is organized by Mari Ruddy, a rider in the Colorado Tour de Cure. The program supplies Red Riders with a bright red cycling jersey and a group for individual red riders to join.

Volunteers 
Each Tour de Cure event recruits volunteers to help set up and take down start and finish lines and rest stops, mark the routes and print out the guide sheets, assist riders who have run into mechanical difficulties, pick up and transport riders who need to drop out of the event (SAG), keep track of which riders have left and returned, keep riders on route and obeying local cycling laws (Route Marshals) and so on. Since 2015, volunteers with diabetes have been called Red Crew and have been provided with red T-shirts with a variant of the Red Rider/Red Strider logo.

Fund-raising 
In 2007, the Tour de Cure raised over $13 million for diabetes. In 2008, over $16 million for diabetes was raised in 78 events nationwide. Each ride has various fund-raising minimums, but in 2013, the base value for minimums nationwide was increased from $150 to $200.

Corporate Support 
Riders of the Tour de Cure may join numerous nationwide and local corporate sponsored teams. National sponsors include:
 Gold's Gym
 AT&T
 Johnson & Johnson
 Valero Energy Corporation
 Dignity Memorial
 Wal-Mart/Sam'S Club
 Cisco

Spokesperson 
Greg LeMond, three-time Tour de France winner, is the national spokesperson.

Locations
Alabama
Birmingham
Huntsville
Alaska
Anchorage
Fairbanks
Arizona
Phoenix
Tucson
Arkansas
Northwest Arkansas
Pulaski County
California
Long Beach
Palo Alto
Sacramento Tour de Cure event
San Diego
Thousand Oaks
Yountville
Colorado
Longmont
Connecticut
North Haven
Delaware
Newark (Since 2011)
Florida
Jacksonville
Orlando
Sarasota
Tampa
Georgia
Tyrone (Atlanta)Tour de Cure Event
Illinois
Chicago Area
Alton
Indiana
Indianapolis
Iowa
Polk County
Kansas
Sedgwick County
Kentucky
Cincinnati
Jefferson County
Louisiana
St. Francisville
Mandeville
Maine
Bar Harbor
Kennebunk
New England Classic
Maryland
Howard County (Cooksville/Columbia)
Massachusetts
Cape Ann
Falmouth
Marshfield
New England Classic
Michigan
Brighton
Middleville
Minnesota
Rochester
Twin Cities
Missouri
Springfield
St. Louis
Weston
Nebraska
Springfield
Nevada
Las Vegas
New Hampshire
New England Classic
Portsmouth
New Jersey
Basking Ridge
Jersey Shore
Princeton
New Mexico
Albuquerque
New York
Buffalo
Long Island
Rochester
Stillwater
Verona Beach
North Carolina
Hampton Roads
Raleigh
North Dakota
Fargo
Ohio
Cincinnati
Columbus
Northeast
Oklahoma
Oklahoma City
Tulsa
Oregon
Portland
Pennsylvania
Boiling Springs
Greater Philadelphia
Harmony
Rhode Island
Narragansett
New England Classic
South Carolina
Columbia
Tennessee
Chattanooga
Knoxville
Nashville
Texas
Austin
Fort Worth
San Antonio
Corpus Christi
Utah
Brigham City
Vermont
New England Classic
South Burlington
Virginia
Hampton Roads
Reston
Washington
Redmond
Washington D.C.
Reston
Wisconsin
Green Bay
Madison
Milwaukee Tour de Cure event.

References

External links 
 Tour de Cure Official Website
 North Carolina Cary-Southern Pines ride: June 4–5, 2011

Bicycle tours
Cycling events in the United States